Leslie Harold West (24 January 1905 – 12 November 1982) was an English cricketer.  West was a right-handed batsman.  He was born at Leytonstone, Essex.

West made his first-class debut for Essex, who he was invited to trial for in the 1928 County Championship against Northamptonshire.  He made two further first-class appearances for the county, both in 1928 against Glamorgan and Essex.  In his three appearances he scored 33 runs at an average of 6.60, with a high score of 30.

In later life he coached cricket.  He died at the town of his birth on 12 November 1982 while attending a cricket dinner.

References

External links
Leslie West at ESPNcricinfo
Leslie West at CricketArchive

1905 births
1982 deaths
People from Leytonstone
English cricketers
Essex cricketers
English cricket coaches